Elastoplast is a brand of adhesive bandages (also called sticking plasters) and medical dressings made by Beiersdorf.

Background
In 1928 Smith & Nephew of the UK acquired the licence to market and produce the Elastoplast range of bandages.

Beiersdorf bought brand rights for the Commonwealth from Smith & Nephew in 1992. It has become a genericized trademark for "sticking plaster" in some Commonwealth countries including the United Kingdom and Australia.

In some countries in Europe Hansaplast, a brand name started by Beiersdorf in 1922, is used instead. A third trademark, named Curitas, is used in parts of Latin America.

Nick Kochan wrote about Elastoplast in his book The World's Greatest Brands (1996); noting that "the early success of the brand was due to its high-stretch fabric material coupled with an effective adhesive"; and that it has as strong position in worldwide markets, particularly in the UK.

In the 1970s Elastoplast marketed its Airstrip product as "the fresh air plaster". The plasters were sold in small flat tin.

On 4 July 2005 Elastoplast launched a £1.1m advertising campaign which introduced brand heroes called "the Plastermen". with the animated characters launched the company's new SilverHealing plasters.

Other brand use 
Hansaplast Noise Stop are earplugs for hearing protection.

See also 
Band-Aid
Curad
Nexcare

References 

Beiersdorf brands
First aid